The 2022 Salinas Challenger, also known as Challenger de Salinas Copa Banco Guayaquil presentado por CNT for sponsorship reasons, was a professional tennis tournament played on hard courts. It was the 22nd edition of the tournament which was part of the 2022 ATP Challenger Tour. It took place in Salinas, Ecuador between 4 and 10 April 2022.

Singles main-draw entrants

Seeds

 1 Rankings as of 21 April 2022.

Other entrants
The following players received wildcards into the singles main draw:
  Pedro Boscardin Dias
  Álvaro Guillén Meza
  Cayetano March

The following players received entry from the qualifying draw:
  Blu Baker
  Felix Corwin
  Matías Franco Descotte
  Brandon Holt
  Naoki Nakagawa
  Sho Shimabukuro

Champions

Singles

 Emilio Gómez def.  Nicolas Moreno de Alboran 6–7(2–7), 7–6(7–4), 7–5.

Doubles

  Yuki Bhambri /  Saketh Myneni def.  JC Aragone /  Roberto Quiroz 4–6, 6–3, [10–7].

References

2022 ATP Challenger Tour
2022 in Ecuadorian sport
April 2022 sports events in South America